Mahou is a village and rural commune in the Yorosso Cercle in the Sikasso Region of southern Mali. The commune covers an area of 263 square kilometers and includes 4 villages. In the 2009 census it had a population of 16,212. The village of Mahou, the administrative center (chef-lieu), is 30 km southeast of Yorosso on the border with Burkina Faso.

References

External links
.

Communes of Sikasso Region
Burkina Faso–Mali border crossings